"Dear" is the second single released by ViViD, release a month after their debut single "Take-off". It was first released in CD+DVD only format and it features their first PV. When it sold out, a CD version was released on February 1, 2010. The CD+DVD release is limited, having only 3,000 copies. The single reached #2 on the indies Oricon weekly chart and #44 on the over charts where it charted for a week; it has sold 2,023 copies.

Track listing

2009 singles
Vivid (band) songs
2009 songs
Song articles with missing songwriters